Hjørundfjorden is a fjord in the traditional district of Sunnmøre in Møre og Romsdal county, Norway. It is located mostly within the municipality of Ørsta, although part of the mouth of the fjord is in Sykkylven. Villages along the shores of the fjord include Molaupen, Hundeidvik, Trandal, Sæbø, and Store Standal.

The area surrounding the Hjørundfjorden was part of the municipality of Hjørundfjord from 1838 until 1964.

The Hjørundfjorden is surrounded by the Sunnmørsalpene mountain range in Ørsta and Sykkylven, with mountain peaks reaching  straight up from the fjord, including Skårasalen and Skopphorn.  Both sides of the fjord are heavily wooded, the result of the extensive rainfall on one of the world's wettest fjords.

See also
 List of Norwegian fjords

References

Fjords of Møre og Romsdal
Ørsta
Sykkylven